The Chevrolet Stylemaster is an automobile produced by Chevrolet in the United States for the 1946, 1947 and 1948 model years.

1946
The Series DJ Stylemaster was introduced as the base trim level model in the 1946 Chevrolet range, along with the top level Series DK Chevrolet Fleetmaster. The Stylemaster, which was essentially an updated 1942 Chevrolet Master Deluxe, was powered by a  Straight-six engine driving through a 3-speed manual transmission. It was offered in 2-door Town Sedan, 4-door Sport Sedan, 2-door Business Coupe and 2-door 5-Passenger Coupe models, the Business Coupe differing from the 5-Passenger Coupe in having a front seat only.

1947
The 1947 Series 1500 EJ Stylemaster was little changed from its predecessor, the most notable visual difference being a new radiator grille with a more horizontal theme.

1948
The 1948 Series 1500 FJ Stylemaster was again little changed from the previous year. There were no significant body alterations, however the radiator grille featured a vertical centre bar. A Club Coupe was now offered  replacing the 5-Passenger Coupe of 1947.

Replacement
For the 1949 model year the Stylemaster was replaced by the 1500 GJ Series Chevrolet Special, offered in Styleline and Fleetline sub-series.

Australia production
The Chevrolet Stylemaster was also produced by General Motors-Holden's in Australia. As Holden had carried over the body tooling from its 1942 models, the Australian sedan differed from its US counterpart in having a different body with rear-hinged back doors and a larger trunk. The grilles fitted to the Australian models were the same as those used on the US models. Australian production included a coupe utility, which was, like the sedan, produced in 1946, 1947 and 1948 models.

References

External links

Stylemaster
Cars introduced in 1946